The Harbor Beach Lighthouse is a "sparkplug lighthouse" located at the end of the north breakwall entrance to the harbor of refuge on Lake Huron.  The breakwall and light were created by the United States Army Corps of Engineers to protect the harbor of Harbor Beach, Michigan, which is the largest man-made freshwater harbor in the world.  Harbor Beach is located on the eastern edge of the Thumb of Huron County, in the state of Michigan.

History 

Prior to the 1900s, this port was a major harbor of refuge and was the home of one of the most active lifesaving crews on Lake Huron.  In the 1880s, a massive breakwater extension was constructed and many lake boats took shelter.  Dozens of shipwrecks lie around the area, evidence of the boats that tried, but did not make, the shelter.

Since 1885, the Harbor Beach Breakwater Lighthouse has been an area of refuge to ships caught in the fury of Mother Nature and Lake Huron during stormy seas.  This lighthouse replaced the wood skeleton lighthouse which was built in 1877.

The new lighthouse was built on a timber foundation crib. It is a conical, brick structure encased in cast iron plates. The building was originally painted brown; it thereafter went through iterations where it had a black parapet and lantern. At the top a round cast-iron watch room supports a ten-sided, cast iron lantern. A concrete cap, partially faced with brick veneer, supports the  tower. Below the brick veneer, extending to the lake bottom is a timber cribbing filled with  stones, which provides the necessary counterweight needed to prevent the structure from overturning or sliding.

The light shares its design and engineering with the Detroit River Light which was also built in 1885.

In the lighthouse, the first deck housed a kitchen with a cook stove and also was a living area. The next two decks were sleeping quarters. The second deck was for the assistants, the third deck for the keeper. The fourth deck was used as a workroom and fifth was the watch room at the balcony level. The lantern room is located at the top on the sixth deck. This housed the original Fresnel lens, made by Barbier & Fenstre in Paris in 1884, which is now on display at the Grice House and Museum in Harbor Beach. Next to the Harbor Beach lighthouse was a small wooden building, which contained equipment to operate the fog signal (see undated USCG photo above), but was removed when the light was automated.  There is a diaphone in place.

The Great Storm of 1913 substantially undermined the pier's foundation, necessitating repairs.

Current activities
Today, the lighthouse is automated and operated remotely, year round, by the United States Coast Guard in Saginaw, Michigan, and is a welcome sight for the many recreational boaters and commercial fishermen that travel Lake Huron between Port Huron and the Saginaw Bay area. In 1967, the fourth order Fresnel lens was removed, and replaced with a  Vega acrylic optic. The light and fog signal have been solar-powered since 2006. A fog signal is available by calling channel 79, and keying five times, causing the fog signal to sound with a three-second blast every thirty seconds, which will continue for forty-five minutes.

The City of Harbor Beach is now the owner of the Harbor Beach Lighthouse. Ceremonies to transfer ownership of the historic structure took place in Traverse City on June 16, 2010.  A local ceremony took place July 31, 2010.  The Harbor Beach Lighthouse Preservation Society (HBLPS) was formed in 1984 and restoration is ongoing.  The lighthouse has been waterproofed, ventilated, and its floors, interior walls, and windows restored to original appearance.

The Light is listed on the National Register of Historic Places, Reference #83000850
HARBOR BEACH LIGHTHOUSE (U.S. COAST GUARD/GREAT LAKES TR), and is also on the State List.

Getting there
From M-25 (Huron Avenue) in Harbor Beach, turn east on Trescott Street and follow to its end at Bathing Beach Park.  A good, distant shot of the lighthouse is available from the end of Trescott pier.  In addition, the Marina and Waterworks Park, on the north end of the city, offers a good view of the lighthouse.

Lighthouse and harbor timeline

See also
Lighthouses in the United States

References

External links

 Official Harbor Beach Lighthouse Preservation Society Website
 Huelse, Klaus -- Meine Leuchtturm-Seite: Leuchttürme USA auf historischen Postkarten -- Historic postcard images of U.S. lighthouses, Historic Post Card View of Harbor Beach Lighthouse.
 Interactive map, list, information for lighthouses in North and West Lake Huron.
 Map of Michigan Lighthouses on Michigan.gov website.
  Presentation of The Harbor Beach Lighthouse Preservation Society.
  Terry Pepper, Seeing the Light, Harbor Beach Light

Lighthouses completed in 1885
Buildings and structures in Huron County, Michigan
Harbor Beach, Michigan
Lighthouses on the National Register of Historic Places in Michigan
Transportation in Huron County, Michigan
Saginaw Bay
National Register of Historic Places in Huron County, Michigan